In sedimentary geology and geomorphology, the term progradation refers to the growth of a river delta farther out into the sea over time. This occurs when the volume of incoming sediment is greater than the volume of the delta that is lost through subsidence, sea-level rise, or erosion.

Progradation can be caused by:

 Periods of sea-level fall which result in marine regression. This can occur during major continental glaciations within ice ages, be caused by changes in the rates of seafloor spreading that affects the volume of the ocean basins, or tectonic effects on the regional mantle density structure that can change the geoid elevation.
 Extremely high sediment input, such as by the Huang He (Yellow River) in China, which drains the Loess plateau, or from high sediment loads in proglacial rivers.

See also

References

Sedimentology
Stratigraphy